Shakhovskoy District is an administrative and municipal district (raion), one of the thirty-six in Moscow Oblast, Russia. It is located in the west of the oblast. Its administrative center is the urban locality (a work settlement) of Shakhovskaya. Population: 25,372 (2010 Census);  The population of Shakhovskaya accounts for 42.3% of the district's total population.

Notable residents 

Leonīds Breikšs (1908–1942), Latvian poet, born in Yelizarovo village

References

Notes

Sources

 
Districts of Moscow Oblast